Jim Fisher (born 17 June 1975) is a Canadian cyclist. He competed in the men's track time trial at the 2000 Summer Olympics.

Fisher was inducted into the Manitoba Sports Hall of Fame in 2008.

References

External links
 

1975 births
Living people
Canadian male cyclists
Olympic cyclists of Canada
Cyclists at the 2000 Summer Olympics
Place of birth missing (living people)